The Winchuck River (Tolowa: duu-sr-xuu-shi taa-ghin-li~') is a short coastal stream that runs through the Rogue River–Siskiyou National Forest to the Pacific Ocean in the U.S. states of Oregon and California.

Formed by the confluence of Fourth of July Creek and Bear Creek in southern Curry County, the river flows generally west. Just below the source, Salmon Creek enters from the left, then Elk Creek and Deer Creek enter from the right. Further downstream, the Winchuck receives Moser Creek and the South Fork Winchuck River, both from the left. The river then leaves Oregon, flowing in Del Norte County, California, for a short distance before re-entering Oregon. The Winchuck passes under U.S. Route 101 in Oregon just before reaching the ocean. Winchuck River Road runs along or near the north side of the river for much of its course.

The main stem and tributaries support chinook and coho salmon, steelhead, and sea-run coastal cutthroat trout. Access for fishing is limited, especially along the lower stretches of the river. Fishing from boats is not allowed, but Winchuck River Road provides public access in places.

Flora in the watershed's forests include Douglas-fir, bigleaf maple, and madrone, typical of the Southern Oregon Coast Range, the coastal Siskiyou Mountains, and the Redwoods Zone. Most of Oregon's remaining coast redwood forest lies within the Winchuck drainage. Sensitive fauna in the watershed include the spotted owl and marbled murrelet.

References

Works cited

McGuire, Mike (June 2001). "Winchuck River Watershed Assessment" (PDF). Oregon Department of Fish and Wildlife. Retrieved April 12, 2011.

External links
Curry Watersheds

Rivers of Curry County, Oregon
Rivers of Oregon
Oregon placenames of Native American origin